Crossopteryx is a monotypic genus of flowering plants in the family Rubiaceae. The genus contains only one species, viz. Crossopteryx febrifuga, which is found in tropical and southern Africa.

References

External links
Crossopteryx in the World Checklist of Rubiaceae
 

Monotypic Rubiaceae genera
Crossopterygeae